Georgios Semertzidis (born 14 June 1957) is a Greek football midfielder and later manager.

References

1957 births
Living people
Greek footballers
Association football midfielders
Aris Thessaloniki F.C. players
Olympiacos F.C. players
Apollon Pontou FC players
Super League Greece players
Greece international footballers
Greek football managers
Aris Thessaloniki F.C. managers
Footballers from Thessaloniki